James Robert Walton (born June 5, 1934, at Shattuck, Oklahoma) is an American Major League Baseball scout, who served for three seasons (1973–1975) in MLB as the first base coach for the Milwaukee Brewers of the American League.

He played in the Baltimore Orioles, Washington Senators and Cincinnati Reds farm systems (1954–1955; 1959–1960), as an infielder, outfielder and pitcher. In  he joined the Houston Colt .45s' organization as a minor league manager — one year before the Houston team debuted in MLB. He managed in the Georgia–Florida League in 1962–1963, filling in as an active player during the 1962 season. He then scouted for Colt .45s/Astros through 1971, when he moved to the Brewers as a scout and interim manager at the Double-A level, with the 1972 San Antonio Brewers of the Texas League.

Walton was added to the staff as first base coach and third base coach of Milwaukee manager Del Crandall for the  season, and served for three full campaigns. Walton also served as a coach to the American League Team for the 1975 All-Star Game. He is based in his hometown of Shattuck.

In addition to continuing scouting for the Major League Scouting Bureau, Walton was appointed as the Advance Scout for Team USA's baseball team and was a part of the team for their Olympic Gold Medal win in the Olympic Games in Sydney, Australia in 2000. Walton continues to work tirelessly with prospective baseball players from all ages. Having assisted in building an indoor practice facility in his hometown of Shattuck, Oklahoma, players, both professional and those wishing to play professional baseball come from all over the country to work out with Walton and obtain his extended knowledge of the mechanics of playing baseball and to improve their skills. At the 2009 Winter Meetings in Nashville, Tennessee Walton was awarded with the Scout of the Year award.

Walton was married to Nancy E. (Foster) Walton in December, 1961 and they have one son, Paul Walton, born October, 1963. Mr. Walton and his wife Nancy still reside in Shattuck, Oklahoma where he continues to base his Major League scouting work year-round.

References

External links

1934 births
Living people
Ada Herefords players
Baseball players from Oklahoma
Geneva Redlegs players
Houston Astros scouts
Milwaukee Brewers coaches
Minor league baseball managers
Major League Baseball first base coaches
Major League Baseball scouts
Moultrie Colt .22s players
People from Shattuck, Oklahoma
Salisbury Braves players